Pedro Araújo (born July 2, 1993) is a Dominican former professional baseball pitcher. He has played in Major League Baseball (MLB) for the Baltimore Orioles .

Career

Chicago Cubs
Araújo signed as an international free agent with the Chicago Cubs. Spending most of the 2017 season with the Myrtle Beach Pelicans of the Class A-Advanced Carolina League, and also briefly appearing for the Tennessee Smokies of the Class AA Southern League, Araújo pitched to a 1.76 earned run average (ERA) with 87 strikeouts in  innings pitched. After the regular season, the Cubs assigned him to the Mesa Solar Sox of the Arizona Fall League, and he pitched to a 1.74 ERA.

Baltimore Orioles
The Orioles selected Araújo from the Chicago Cubs organization in the 2017 Rule 5 draft. He made the Orioles' Opening Day 25-man roster in 2018, and made his major league debut on March 31. On April 3, 2019, Araujo was designated for assignment following the promotion of Matt Wotherspoon. Araujo was returned to the Chicago Cubs on April 5. On the same day, Araujo was traded back to the Orioles for international pool money. He became a free agent following the 2019 season.

On January 20, 2020, Araújo signed with the Diablos Rojos del México of the Mexican League. Araújo did not play in a game in 2020 due to the cancellation of the Mexican League season because of the COVID-19 pandemic. He later became a free agent.

See also
Rule 5 draft results

References

External links

1993 births
Living people
People from San Cristóbal, Dominican Republic
Dominican Republic expatriate baseball players in the United States
Major League Baseball players from the Dominican Republic
Major League Baseball pitchers
Baltimore Orioles players
Dominican Summer League Cubs players
Arizona League Cubs players
Eugene Emeralds players
South Bend Cubs players
Myrtle Beach Pelicans players
Águilas Cibaeñas players
Tennessee Smokies players
Bowie Baysox players
Mesa Solar Sox players
Norfolk Tides players